Koonyaboothie located between Pindera Downs Aboriginal Area and Tibooburra is a cadastral parish of Tongowoko County in New South Wales, Australia.

The Geography, of the parish is mostly the flat, arid landscape of the Channel Country. The parish has a Köppen climate classification of BWh (Hot desert).

The nearest town is Tibooburra

References

Parishes of Tongowoko County
Far West (New South Wales)